Tremaine Aldon Neverson (born November 28, 1984), known professionally as Trey Songz, is an American R&B singer and rapper. His debut album, I Gotta Make It, was released in 2005 through Atlantic Records. His follow-up album, Trey Day, spawned his first top 20 single, "Can't Help but Wait". Songz released his third album, Ready, in 2009 and a single from the album, "Say Aah" (featuring Fabolous), peaked at No. 9 on the Billboard Hot 100 making it Songz's first top 10 hit. Ready was nominated for Best Male R&B Vocal Performance at the 2008 Grammy Awards. The following year saw Songz's highest-charting song to date, "Bottoms Up" (featuring Nicki Minaj), from his fourth studio album, Passion, Pain & Pleasure (2010).

In 2012, Songz released his first number one album, Chapter V, which debuted atop the Billboard 200. The album's lead single, "Heart Attack", was nominated for Best R&B Song at the 2013 Grammy Awards. Following that, Songz released his sixth studio album Trigga in 2014, his seventh studio album Tremaine in 2017, and his eighth studio album Back Home in 2020. He has sold over 25 million records worldwide in singles and albums.

Early life 
Tremaine Aldon Neverson was born on November 28, 1984 in Petersburg, Virginia. He is the son of April (Gholson) Tucker, who was seventeen when he was born, and Claude Neverson Jr. Raised as a military brat by his mother and stepfather, Neverson did not have aspirations for a musical career as a child due to his shyness, saying "Singing wasn't a reality for me, until other people started noticing I sounded good." He recognized his vocal abilities at the age of 14. Reluctant to sing, he began performing with encouragement by friends and family in high school.

Career

2003–2008: I Gotta Make It and Trey Day 

Record producer Troy Taylor was introduced to Songz through Songz's stepfather with whom Taylor attended high school, ultimately leading to Songz signing a recording contract with Atlantic Records in 2003. After graduating from Petersburg High School in 2002, Songz moved to New Jersey to begin recording his debut album, though recording did not actually begin until 2003. While recording his debut album in 2004, Songz released multiple mixtapes under the alias Prince of Virginia. One of the mixtapes featured an "answer track" to R. Kelly's "Trapped in the Closet", entitled "Open the Closet". The song gave Songz some notoriety. His debut album, I Gotta Make It was released on July 26, 2005. It debuted at #20 on the Billboard 200, selling 40,000 copies in its first week of sales. It has sold 300,000 records in the US. Songz's debut single, "Gotta Make It", featuring Twista, was released in March 2005 and reached #87 on the Billboard Hot 100 and #21 on the Hot R&B/Hip-Hop Songs. It garnered success in the R&B/urban community but failed to make a mark in mainstream music. The album's second and final single, "Gotta Go", was released in July 2005 and reached #67 on the Hot 100 and #11 on the Hot R&B/Hip-Hop Songs chart, becoming even more successful than his debut single in the R&B/urban community and in the mainstream community. After promotion for his debut concluded, he was featured on the lead single from Twista's fifth album, The Day After. The single, "Girl Tonite", reached #14 on the Hot 100 and #3 on the Hot R&B/Hip-Hop Songs chart, becoming a huge hit.

In mid-2006, Songz began work on a follow-up album to his debut with longtime collaborator Troy Taylor and also employed successful Bryan-Michael Cox, Danja, Stargate, and R. Kelly to help create the album. Trey aimed for the album to be more mainstream-oriented than his debut album. His second studio album, Trey Day, was released on October 2, 2007. The album reached #11 on the Billboard 200, selling 73,000 copies in its first week. It has since sold 400,000 records in the US, becoming his second album not to be certified by the RIAA. The album was going to be released on May 8, 2007, but was continually delayed in order for a successful single to precede the album, as the lead single failed to impact charts.  

His second album was preceded by the lead single, "Wonder Woman", which was released in February 2007. It reached #54 on the Hot R&B/Hip-Hop Songs chart, but failed to impact the Hot 100. Because of the single's failure, his second album was delayed from May 2007 to October 2007. The album's second single, "Can't Help but Wait", was released in August 2007 and was released to promote his second album and the film Step Up 2 the Streets soundtrack as a single for it. The single reached #14 on the Hot 100, and #2 on the Hot R&B/Hip-Hop Songs chart. It became Songz's first Top 20 hit on the Hot 100, and helped to boost his second album's sales. The single was also nominated for Best Male R&B Vocal Performance at the 2008 50th Grammy Awards. The third single from the album, "Last Time", was released in January 2008 and reached #69 on the Hot 100, and #9 on the Hot R&B/Hip-Hop Songs chart. The fourth and final single from the album, "Missin' You", was released in May 2008, but failed to chart completely. In mid-2008, Songz was nominated for a BET Award for Best Male R&B Artist but did not win the award.

2009–2011: Ready and Passion, Pain & Pleasure 

In 2008, Trey began work on his third studio album with Bryan-Michael Cox, Sean Garrett, Stargate and Troy Taylor and aimed for a more mature record than his first two. Before releasing his third album, Songz released a mixtape titled Anticipation in June 2009 through his blog, which featured songs from his third album. Another mixtape from Trey was released in the summer of 2009, called Genesis. Genesis was a collection of Trey Songz's first recordings when he was fifteen years old and was released to show his fans the dedication that he had to making a record when he was young. Trey released his third studio album, Ready, on August 31, 2009. The album reached #3 on the Billboard 200, selling 131,000 copies in its first week. These are his best first week sales to date and the album was his first to reach the Top 10 on the Billboard 200. The album has since sold over 1,000,000 records in the US, earning a Platinum certification from the RIAA in June 2014, becoming his first Platinum album.

The lead single from the album, "I Need a Girl", was released in April 2009 and reached #5 on the Hot R&B/Hip-Hop songs chart and #59 on the Hot 100, becoming an R&B/urban hit but not a mainstream hit. A promotional single, "Successful", featuring rapper Drake, was released in June 2009 and reached #17 on the Hot 100, becoming Songz's third Top 20 hit. The single also served as the second and final single from Drake's EP, So Far Gone. The second official single from his third album, "LOL Smiley Face", featuring Soulja Boy and Gucci Mane, was released in August 2009 and reached #51 on the Hot 100 and #12 on the Hot R&B/Hip-Hop Songs chart. The third single from the album, "I Invented Sex", featuring Drake, was released in October 2009 and reached #42 on the Hot 100 but #1 on the Hot R&B/Hip-Hop Songs chart, becoming his first single to top that chart. Like the first two singles from the album, it achieved success in the R&B/urban community but only some mainstream success. Charted within the Billboard Hot 100, and topped the R&B chart. The fourth single from the album, "Say Aah", featuring rapper Fabolous, was released in January 2010 and reached #9 on the Hot 100 and #3 on the Hot R&B/Hip-Hop Songs chart. The single has become Trey's highest-charting single on the Hot 100 and one of his most successful singles on the Hot R&B/Hip-Hop Songs chart. He also collaborated with R&B singer Amerie on her song "Pretty Brown", the third single from her fourth album, In Love & War.

The fifth and final single from the album, "Neighbors Know My Name", was released in February 2010 and reached #43 on the Hot 100 and #4 on the Hot R&B/Hip-Hop Songs chart. A sixth single, "Yo Side of the Bed", was going to be released in June 2010, but its release was canceled due to unknown reasons. A music video, featuring singer Keri Hilson, was filmed and released, however. Songz was also the opening act for Jay-Z on his Jay-Z Fall Tour in late 2009. The album was nominated for Best Contemporary R&B Album at the 52nd Grammy Awards in 2010, but lost to Beyoncé's I Am... Sasha Fierce. On April 1, 2010, he recorded an episode of MTV Unplugged, which aired on April 26, 2010. A documentary-series about Trey, Trey Songz: My Moment, began in June 2010 to positive reviews and high ratings. The 10-part series ended in August 2010 and follows Trey during his time as opening act on the Jay-Z Fall Tour in late 2009.

Songz's fourth studio album, Passion, Pain & Pleasure, was released on September 14, 2010. Trey began work on the album in early 2010 with Sean Garrett, Troy Taylor and Stargate and has stated that the album will be his most personal to date and was completed in July 2010. The album's lead single, "Bottoms Up", featuring rapper Nicki Minaj, was released on July 27, 2010, and has reached number 6 on the Billboard Hot 100 chart, becoming his biggest hit to date. The single has since been certified 3× Platinum.  "Can't Be Friends" was released as the album's second single in August 2010. Songz embarked on the Passion, Pain & Pleasure Tour on August 6, 2010, with singer Monica. The tour is his first headlining tour to date and consists of shows in venues that seat 3,000 to 5,000 people. Songz also contributed the song "Already Taken" to the Step Up 3D soundtrack, which was released on July 27, 2010. He filmed a video for the song, which was released in July 2010.  The leading lady in the video is former girlfriend and professional dancer Helen Gedlu. Songz appeared at the 2010 MTV Video Music Awards on September 12, 2010. Songz also performed at the BET Awards 2011 which was broadcast on June 26, 2011.

2011–2012: Chapter V 

On August 18, 2011, it was announced Songz will be working on his fifth studio album titled Chapter V. In an interview Trey said the album, which would act as the follow-up to Passion, Pain & Pleasure, was nearing completion. He also said, "It's my sixth year in the game so I've been here for a while now. You can expect the best me you've ever heard. I don't have any release dates in mind right now but I'm just making music and enjoying myself in the studio and having fun. I have a few dream collaborations on that album that I want, but they say if you blow out your candle and make a wish you can't tell people what you ask for or it won't come true".

On November 28, 2011, his 27th birthday, Songz released his Inevitable EP to prepare for the release of his album. The EP opened with first week sales of 27,000 landing it at No. 23 on the Billboard 200 and No. 4 on Billboards Top Hip-Hop R&B Albums chart. As of October 18, 2012, the EP has sold 91,000 copies in the United States. In February 2012, Songz will embark on his Anticipation 2our to promote his mixtape Anticipation 2 and to raise awareness of his new album. In July 2011, he was cast in Texas Chainsaw 3D as Ryan, the male lead role. The film was released on January 4, 2013.

Chapter V was released on August 21, 2012, by Atlantic Records, and on August 17 as a digital download. Trey Songz toured in promotion of the album on his Anticipation 2our, a tour spanning from February 9 to March 11, 2012, in North America. Rapper Big Sean was the tour's supporting act. The album debuted at number one on the US Billboard 200 chart, with first week sales of 135,000 copies. It was Songz' first album to top the chart. Chapter V was also Songz' first album to chart in the United Kingdom, where it peaked at number 10 on the UK Albums Chart. As of October 3, 2012, the album has sold 238,400 copies in the US, according to Nielsen SoundScan. The album's lead single, "Heart Attack", was released as a digital download on March 26, 2012. It charted at number 35 on the Billboard Hot 100, and number 28 on the UK Singles Chart. Its music video was released on May 4 and featured then girlfriend Kelly Rowland playing Songz' love interest. The second single "2 Reasons" was released on June 12. Its video was premiered on June 12 by BET's 106 & Park. "Simply Amazing" was released in the United Kingdom on August 12. It charted at number eight in the UK. Its music video, directed by Justin Francis, was released on July 23. "Never Again" was released as a single in the UK in November. Its music video was released on November 21.

 2013–2017: Trigga and Tremaine the Album 
On June 20, 2013, in a radio interview with KS 107.5, Songz confirmed that he had already recorded about eight songs for his sixth studio album. On Christmas Day, Songz released the song titled "Na Na" on The Angel Network. In February 2014, Songz released another track featuring Young Jeezy called "Ordinary" and he was also featured on the remix to Mariah Carey's single, "You're Mine (Eternal)". In March 2014, Songz released the second single of his album called "SmartPhones". On April 1, 2014, 50 Cent released a single featuring Songz, titled "Smoke", from his fifth studio album Animal Ambition. On July 1, 2014, Trey Songz released his sixth album Trigga and it debuted at number one on the US Billboard 200 with first-week sales of 105,000 copies.

On May 18, 2015, Songz digitally released the full-length album Intermission I & II. Half of the tracks on the album were previously available on the Intermission EP, which was released on April 14, 2015. Tremaine The Album was released on March 24, 2017, three years after his last LP. This album is based on his given name, Tremaine Aldon Neverson. The LP is made up of 15 songs and the lone feature comes from fellow Virginia artist and frequent collaborator MIKExANGEL on "Games We Play."

 2020–present: Back Home 
On April 29, 2020, Trey Songz released "Back Home" featuring Summer Walker. The song was produced by Hitmaka and samples Rose Royce's "I'm Going Down". On June 5, in response to the uprising following the murders of George Floyd and Breonna Taylor, Songz released "2020 Riots: How Many Times". He also released an accompanying video. On August 14, Songz released the second single "Circles", which was produced by his longtime collaborator Troy Taylor. The official video was directed by Mahaneela and is said to have been inspired by Black love. Songz' eighth album, Back Home, was released on October 9, 2020.

 Personal life 

In April 2019, Songz announced the birth of his first child, a son, with Caro Colon.

 Artistry 
Songz possesses a tenor vocal range. His music is generally R&B. Songz's musical influences include Luther Vandross, Prince, R. Kelly, Michael Jackson, and Usher.

 Legal issues 
In December 2016, following a performance at Joe Louis Arena in Detroit, Songz was arrested and charged with felony assault of a police officer and misdemeanor aggravated assault for injuring a photographer. It was alleged that the singer "began throwing objects after the venue cut his concert short due to an 11:30 pm curfew" and to have "struck an officer with his fist". Trey Songz pleaded guilty in August 2017 to two reduced counts of disturbing the peace, and was sentenced to 18 months of probation, substance screening and anger-management classes.

On January 22, 2017, actress/singer Keke Palmer accused Songz of secretly filming her and using the footage without her permission in the music video for his remix with Fabolous of the Travis Scott and Young Thug song “Pick Up the Phone”. She also accused him of using "sexual intimidation" while recording her, and that at one point during the alleged incident she hid from him in a closet.

In June 2018, Songz was sued in federal court for the incident that took place following the 2016 Detroit concert. A Detroit police officer alleges in the lawsuit that he suffered a "career-ending brain injury", and had to undergo a hip replacement when Songz allegedly punched him in the face. The officer alleged that after being hit, he and Songz fell to the floor, with the singer landing on top of the officer, causing him to hit his head on the concrete and also hurt his hip. A photographer working the show, also a party to the lawsuit, alleged that he sustained a head injury after Songz allegedly threw a microphone stand at him.

On January 24, 2021, Songz was arrested in Kansas City, Missouri, while attending the conference championship game between the Kansas City Chiefs and Buffalo Bills. Songz was being heckled by fans, and he asked them to "chill out". An officer came over, and from sources and a video released by TMZ, an altercation ensued. This altercation led to Songz being arrested, and charged with trespassing and resisting arrest, both misdemeanors, and assaulting a police officer, a felony. He was released from custody the next day. Sources connected to Songz with direct knowledge told TMZ he believes the officer in question had been biased against him long before the altercation, and when the officer approached him he was immediately aggressive. Another source says the officer's issue before the incident was that Songz and his crew were not wearing masks and refused to put them on. The Kansas City Police Department released the security video from their section, which showed that the police warned Songz and his entourage several times during multiple encounters with security and police, eventually resulting in Songz being escorted out of the seating area, at which point he threw the first punch at the police officer.

 Sexual assault allegations 
A woman claimed that Songz sexually assaulted her at E11Even Miami nightclub on January 1, 2018. She later filed a lawsuit seeking damages of $10 million. On December 30, 2021, Dylan Gonzalez, a former member of University of Las Vegas' women's basketball team, tweeted, "Trey Songz Is A Rapist". On January 11, 2022, she released a statement on social media accusing Songz of raping her "at a well known Las Vegas hotel". Songz later denied the accusation. In February 2022, a third woman accused Trey Songz of rape, saying he anally raped her in March 2016.

 Discography Studio albums'''
 I Gotta Make It (2005)
 Trey Day (2007)
 Ready (2009)
 Passion, Pain & Pleasure (2010)
 Chapter V (2012)
 Trigga (2014)
 Tremaine (2017)
 Back Home (2020)

 Tours 
Headlining
Cingular College Tour HBCUs (2005)
Trey Day Tour (2007/08)
 Ready Tour (2009)
 Passion, Pain & Pleasure Tour (2010)
 Anticipation 2our (2012)
 Chapter V World Tour (2012)
 Between The Sheets Tour w/ Chris Brown feat. Tyga (2015)
 Tremaine The Tour (2017)

Opening act
 Jay-Z's The Blueprint 3 Tour (2010)
 Usher's OMG Tour (2010)
 Nicki Minaj's The Pinkprint Tour (2015)

 Filmography 

 Film 

 Television 

 Awards and nominations 
 Grammy Awards 

!Ref.
|-
| 2009
| "Can't Help but Wait"
| Best Male R&B Vocal Performance
| 
|
|-
| 2010
| Ready''
| Best Contemporary R&B Album
| 
|
|-
| 2013
| "Heart Attack"
| Best R&B Song
| 
|

Other awards

References

External links 

 Official website
 
 Trey Songz net worth

1984 births
Living people
21st-century American male actors
21st-century American singers
African-American male actors
African-American male rappers
African-American male singers
American contemporary R&B singers
American male film actors
American male singers
American male television actors
American people of Cameroonian descent
American tenors
Atlantic Records artists
Male actors from Virginia
People from Petersburg, Virginia
Singers from Virginia